Ahmed Mubarak Al-Khalidi (Arabic: أحمد مبارك الخالدي; born 1945, in Jerusalem) has been the Minister of Justice of the Palestinian National Authority since March 2006 when Hamas won the elections and took clear control of the Palestinian Legislative Council. Dr. Al-Khalidi is a former professor of law and dean of the College of Law at An-Najah National University in Nablus, in the West Bank. For several years, he has been instrumental in drafting a permanent Palestinian Constitution. He holds a Ph.D. in Public Law, Political Systems and Constitutional Law from Cairo University, Cairo (Egypt) that was granted in 1979. He has also worked as a lawyer in private commercial practice in Nablus.

References

1945 births
Living people
Cairo University alumni
Government ministers of the Palestinian National Authority
Academic staff of An-Najah National University
20th-century Palestinian lawyers
Palestinian politicians
21st-century Palestinian lawyers